is a sub-kilometer asteroid with a somewhat elongated and angular shape, approximately  in diameter. It is classified as near-Earth object and potentially hazardous asteroid of the Apollo or Amor group. The V-type asteroid has a rotation period of approximately 1.5 hours. It was first observed on 10 November 2017 by the 60-inch Pan-STARRS 1 telescope at Haleakala Observatory in Hawaii.

Orbit and classification 

It orbits the Sun at a distance of 1.0–1.7 AU once every 1 years and 7 months (585 days; semi-major axis of 1.37 AU). Its orbit has an eccentricity of 0.27 and an inclination of 9° with respect to the ecliptic.  is a V-type asteroid with a bright surface.

2018 flyby

 passed 0.0097 AU (3.76 lunar distances) from Earth on 7 March 2018, the closest approach by this asteroid currently known. It brightened to 12th magnitude, making it one of the brightest Near Earth asteroids of the year. It was observed by radar from Goldstone, Green Bank and Arecibo Observatory. Images revealed that  is a slightly elongated and angular body with a size of approximately 160 by 100 meters.

Physical characteristics 

Images obtained at Green Bank and Arecibo observatories in 2018, revealed that  is a slightly elongated and angular body with a size of approximately 160 by 100 meters.

Rotation period 

On 5 March 2018, a rotational lightcurve was obtained from photometric observations by astronomers at the Northolt Branch Observatories. Lightcurve analysis gave a rotation period of 1.5 hours with a brightness amplitude between 0.4 and 0.5 magnitude.

Gallery

Notes

References

External links 
 Asteroid Lightcurve Database (LCDB), query form (info )
 Dictionary of Minor Planet Names, Google books
 Asteroids and comets rotation curves, CdR – Observatoire de Genève, Raoul Behrend
 Discovery Circumstances: Numbered Minor Planets (1)-(5000) – Minor Planet Center
 2017 VR12: Asteroid That Could Be Bigger Than Empire State Building Is About to Pass by Earth 3/2/2018
 

Minor planet object articles (unnumbered)

Near-Earth objects in 2018
20171110